Soul Bounce is an American daily Internet publication devoted to music criticism and commentary, music news, and artist interviews. Its focus is on R&B and soul. However, the range of musical genres covered extends to gospel, hip hop and hip hop soul. 

The site, which was established in 2007, promotes independent artists and underground artists. The site also publishes "Hot 16" year-end lists as annual features detailing the best albums and songs of each year.

History and content 
The website was created in August 2007, by American entertainment journalist Kimberly Hines, who had previously worked as an editor for Vibe magazine. The website's senior editor is Donte Gibson who writes under the pseudonym D-Money. Soul Bounce was created with the purpose to "expand the conversation of urban music beyond the over-exposed and the obvious" and preferably likes to focus on giving attention to underground artists. In October 2007, the website began "Bounce-Worthy", a series where they promote underground artists in an effort to encourage readers to start listening to their music. In June 2015, the website hosted their own #30DaysOfSoul Instagram challenge in celebration of Black Music Month. In 2022, the website was redesigned in an effort to improve the overall user experience. Since their launch, the website has interviewed a variety of celebrities including Anthony Hamilton, Brandy, Cedric the Entertainer, Estelle, Eve, Idris Elba, Ice Cube, Jazmine Sullivan, Kendrick Lamar, K. Michelle, Macy Gray, Regina Hall and Tamar Braxton.

Recognition 
In December 2011, Soul Bounce was listed on Ebony annual "Power 100" list. On July 3, 2014, Hip-Hop Wired named the website's Twitter account, number 25 on their #BlackTwitter100 list. SoulBounce has been recognized and praised by multiple singers, including Ledisi, Trevor Jackson, Keke Wyatt, Goapele, Syleena Johnson, Joss Stone, Durand Bernarr, Raheem DeVaughn, Coco Jones, and Jade Novah. It has also been referenced by media outlets such as CNN, The Root, Vibe, and The Washington Post.

Awards and nominations 

|-
| rowspan="2" |2008
| rowspan="4" |Soul Bounce
|Black Weblog Award for Best Blog Design
|
|-
|Black Weblog Award for Best Music Blog
|
|-
| rowspan="2" |2010
|Soul Train Music Award for Best Soul Site
|
|-
|Black Weblog Award for Best Music Blog
|

References

External links

American music websites
Magazines established in 2007
Music review websites